Lauren Marie Murphy (born July 27, 1983) is an American professional mixed martial artist. She currently competes in the Women's Flyweight division in the Ultimate Fighting Championship (UFC). Murphy formerly competed for Invicta FC where she is a former Invicta FC Bantamweight Champion. As of February 21, 2023, she is #7 in the UFC women's flyweight rankings.

Background 
Murphy grew up in a small town in Alaska. Her father was killed in a plane crash when she was 11, causing issues that led to drinking, using drugs and dropping out of high school. Murphy said about starting martial arts: "I took my son to a Jiu Jitsu class in late 2009, and I took the class with him to encourage him. I fell in love with it and started going all the time. I began training MMA about 3 months later, and took my first pro fight 3 months after that. I did not have any amateur fights." She attended nursing school but dropped out to pursue a career in mixed martial arts.

Mixed martial arts career
Murphy began her pro mixed martial arts career in Alaska on June 9, 2010, fighting in the featherweight division (145 lbs). She won four straight fights and captured two featherweight titles; one for Alaska Fighting Championship and one for the now-defunct promotion Alaska Cage Fighting.

After moving to Florida, Murphy stepped in on short notice to face Jennifer Scott in a bantamweight bout at Legacy Fighting Championship 18 on March 1, 2013. She defeated Scott by TKO in the first round.

Invicta Fighting Championships
Murphy made her Invicta FC debut as a replacement opponent against Kaitlin Young at Invicta FC 5: Penne vs. Waterson on April 5, 2013. She defeated Young by unanimous decision.

On July 13, 2013, Murphy faced Sarah D'Alelio at Invicta FC 6: Coenen vs. Cyborg. She won the fight by unanimous decision.

Murphy faced Miriam Nakamoto for the inaugural Invicta FC Bantamweight Championship at Invicta FC 7: Honchak vs. Smith on December 7, 2013. She won the fight to become the first bantamweight champion when Nakamoto suffered a knee injury in the fourth round.

Ultimate Fighting Championship
On July 3, 2014, it was announced that Murphy had signed with the UFC. She made her debut against Sara McMann at UFC Fight Night 47 on August 16, 2014.  McMann won the fight by split decision.

Murphy faced Liz Carmouche on April 4, 2015 at UFC Fight Night 63. She lost the fight by unanimous decision. However, 10 out of 13 media outlets scored the bout for Murphy, whilst 3 scored it for Carmouche.

Murphy faced Kelly Faszholz on February 21, 2016 at UFC Fight Night: Cowboy vs. Cowboy.  She won the fight via TKO due to punches and elbows in the final seconds of the third round.  The win also earned Murphy her first Fight of the Night bonus award.

Murphy face Katlyn Chookagian on July 13, 2016 at UFC Fight Night: McDonald vs. Lineker. She lost the fight via unanimous decision.

The Ultimate Fighter
In August 2017, it was announced that Murphy would be one of the fighters featured on The Ultimate Fighter 26, where the process to crown the UFC's inaugural 125-pound women's champion will take place.

Murphy, representing team Alvarez, was seeded third and therefore was automatically set to fight fourteenth seed Nicco Montaño. She lost the fight via Unanimous Decision in two rounds, eliminating her from the competition. Later, feeling discontent with her training on Team Alvarez (especially with Alvarez), she switched teams to Gaethje.

UFC return

Murphy was scheduled to face Priscila Cachoeira  on December 1, 2017 at The Ultimate Fighter 26 Finale. However, due to a visa issue, the fight was cancelled and Murphy was asked to be ready to fight as an alternate. With Roxanne Modafferi elevated to the main event to fight Nicco Montaño after Sijara Eubanks was medically disqualified from the title fight, Murphy stepped in to face Barb Honchak. Murphy won the back-and-forth fight by split decision.

Murphy faced Sijara Eubanks at UFC Fight Night: Rivera vs. Moraes on June 1, 2018. She lost the fight via unanimous decision.

Murphy was scheduled to face Ashlee Evans-Smith on February 17, 2019 at UFC on ESPN 1. However on December 19, 2018 Murphy announced and withdraw from the event as she would need more time off to recover from foot surgery.

Murphy faced Mara Romero Borella on August 3, 2019 at UFC on ESPN 5. She won the fight via TKO in the third round.

Murphy faced Andrea Lee on February 8, 2020 at UFC 247. She won the fight via controversial split decision. 12 out of 12 MMA media outlets scored the contest for Lee with none scoring it for Murphy, despite Murphy achieving a higher degree of accuracy and securing the only two takedowns in the fight.

Murphy faced Roxanne Modafferi on June 20, 2020 at UFC Fight Night: Blaydes vs. Volkov. She won the fight by unanimous decision.

Murphy was expected to face Cynthia Calvillo on October 24, 2020 at UFC 254. However, Calvillo was forced to withdraw the bout due to positive COVID-19 test and was replaced by an undisclosed fighter. In turn, the substitute also tested positive for COVID-19 and was replaced by promotional newcomer Liliya Shakirova. Murphy won the fight via a submission in round two.

As the first bout of her new contract, Murphy faced Joanne Calderwood  on June 12, 2021 at UFC 263. She won the fight via split decision.

Murphy faced Valentina Shevchenko for the UFC Women's Flyweight Championship on September 25, 2021 at UFC 266. She lost the fight via technical knockout in round four.

Murphy was scheduled to face Miesha Tate May 14, 2022 at UFC on ESPN 36. However, the bout was moved to UFC 276 for unknown reasons. In turn, a week before that event, Murphy pulled out after she tested positive for COVID-19. The bout was then rescheduled and eventually took place on July 16, 2022 at UFC on ABC 3. Murphy won the fight via unanimous decision.

Murphy faced Jéssica Andrade on January 21, 2023, at UFC 283. She lost the fight via unanimous decision.

Personal life
Murphy has a son from a previous relationship.

Championships and accomplishments

Mixed martial arts
Alaska Cage Fighting
 Alaska Cage Fighting women's featherweight champion (one time)
Alaska Fighting Championship
 Alaska Fighting Championship women's featherweight champion (one time)
Invicta Fighting Championships
 Invicta FC Bantamweight Championship (one time; former)
Ultimate Fighting Championship
Fight of the Night (One time)

Brazilian jiu-jitsu
 2014 IBJJF Blue Belt Middle Weight No Gi World Championship Gold Medalist

Mixed martial arts record

|-
|Loss
|align=center|16–6
|Jéssica Andrade
|Decision (unanimous) 
|UFC 283
|
|align=center|3
|align=center|5:00
|Rio de Janeiro, Brazil
|-
|Win
|align=center|16–5
|Miesha Tate
|Decision (unanimous)
|UFC on ABC: Ortega vs. Rodríguez
|
|align=center|3
|align=center|5:00
|Elmont, New York, United States
|
|-
|Loss
|align=center|15–5
|Valentina Shevchenko
|TKO (elbows and punches)
|UFC 266
|
|align=center|4
|align=center|4:00
|Las Vegas, Nevada, United States
||
|-
|Win
|align=center|15–4
|Joanne Calderwood
|Decision (split)
|UFC 263
|
|align=center|3
|align=center|5:00
|Glendale, Arizona, United States
|
|-
|Win
|align=center|14–4
|Liliya Shakirova
|Submission (rear-naked choke)
|UFC 254
|
|align=center|2
|align=center|3:31
|Abu Dhabi, United Arab Emirates
|
|-
|Win
|align=center|13–4
|Roxanne Modafferi
|Decision (unanimous)
|UFC on ESPN: Blaydes vs. Volkov
|
|align=center|3
|align=center|5:00
|Las Vegas, Nevada, United States
|  
|-
|Win
|align=center|12–4
|Andrea Lee
|Decision (split)
|UFC 247
|
|align=center|3
|align=center|5:00
|Houston, Texas, United States
|
|-
|Win
|align=center|11–4
|Mara Romero Borella
|TKO (knee and elbows)
|UFC on ESPN: Covington vs. Lawler
|
|align=center|3
|align=center|1:46
|Newark, New Jersey, United States
|
|-
|Loss
|align=center|10–4
|Sijara Eubanks
|Decision (unanimous)
|UFC Fight Night: Rivera vs. Moraes
|
|align=center|3
|align=center|5:00
|Utica, New York, United States
|
|-
|Win
|align=center|10–3
|Barb Honchak
|Decision (split)
|The Ultimate Fighter: A New World Champion Finale
|
|align=center|3
|align=center|5:00
|Las Vegas, Nevada, United States
|
|-
|Loss
|align=center|9–3
|Katlyn Chookagian
|Decision (unanimous)
|UFC Fight Night: McDonald vs. Lineker
|
|align=center|3
|align=center|5:00
|Sioux Falls, South Dakota, United States
|
|-
|Win
|align=center|9–2
|Kelly Faszholz
|TKO (elbows and punches)
|UFC Fight Night: Cowboy vs. Cowboy
|
|align=center|3
|align=center|4:55
|Pittsburgh, Pennsylvania, United States
|
|-
|Loss
|align=center|8–2
|Liz Carmouche
|Decision (unanimous)
|UFC Fight Night: Mendes vs. Lamas
|
|align=center|3
|align=center|5:00
|Fairfax, Virginia, United States
|
|-
|Loss
|align=center|8–1
|Sara McMann
|Decision (split)
|UFC Fight Night: Bader vs. St. Preux
|
|align=center|3
|align=center|5:00
|Bangor, Maine, United States
|
|-
| Win
|align=center|8–0
| Miriam Nakamoto
| TKO (knee injury)
| Invicta FC 7: Honchak vs. Smith
| 
|align=center|4 
|align=center|0:23
| Kansas City, Missouri, United States
| 
|-
| Win
|align=center|7–0
| Sarah D'Alelio
| Decision (unanimous)
| Invicta FC 6: Coenen vs. Cyborg
| 
|align=center|3
|align=center|5:00
| Kansas City, Missouri, United States
| 
|-
| Win
|align=center|6–0
| Kaitlin Young
| Decision (unanimous)
| Invicta FC 5: Penne vs. Waterson
| 
|align=center|3
|align=center|5:00
| Kansas City, Missouri, United States
|
|-
| Win
|align=center|5–0
| Jennifer Scott
| TKO (elbows)
| Legacy Fighting Championship 18
| 
|align=center|1
|align=center|4:10
| Houston, Texas, United States
| 
|-
| Win
|align=center|4–0
| Julia Griffin
| TKO (punches)
| Alaska Cage Fighting: Tribute to Veterans
| 
|align=center|2
|align=center|4:26
| Fairbanks, Alaska, United States
| 
|-
| Win
|align=center|3–0
| Willow Bailey
| TKO (retirement)
| Alaska Fighting Championship 79: Champions 
| 
|align=center|2
|align=center|3:00
| Anchorage, Alaska, United States
| 
|-
| Win
|align=center|2–0
| Leslie Wright
| TKO (punches)
| Alaska Fighting Championship 76
| 
|align=center|2
|align=center|2:25
| Anchorage, Alaska, United States
| 
|-
| Win
|align=center|1–0
| Kloiah Wayland
| TKO (punches)
| Alaska Fighting Championship: Mat Su Showdown 2
| 
|align=center|1
|align=center|0:17
| Wasilla, Alaska, United States
|

Mixed martial arts exhibition record

|-
|Loss
|align=center|0–1
|Nicco Montaño
|Decision (unanimous) 
|The Ultimate Fighter: A New World Champion
| (airdate)
|align=center|2
|align=center|5:00
|Las Vegas, Nevada, United States
|

See also
 List of current UFC fighters
 List of female mixed martial artists

References

External links
 
 

1983 births
Living people
American female mixed martial artists
American practitioners of Brazilian jiu-jitsu
Female Brazilian jiu-jitsu practitioners
Bantamweight mixed martial artists
Featherweight mixed martial artists
Mixed martial artists utilizing Brazilian jiu-jitsu
Mixed martial artists from Alaska
Ultimate Fighting Championship female fighters
Sportspeople from Anchorage, Alaska
Women in Alaska
21st-century American women